The Pentameters Theatre was founded in 1968 and is still run by artistic director Leonie Scott-Matthews, a well known Hampstead resident. It is a 60-seat venue and is a fringe theatre in the London Borough of Camden, located above the Three Horseshoes public house in Hampstead.

History of the theatre
The theatre  began in a disused skittle alley in the basement of the Freemason's Arms, Hampstead, in August 1968. It moved to an open-air site and also to the Haverstock Arms before moving to its present location in October 1971. It was  founded to present poets reading their work in an informal theatrical pub setting.

Recent years
Scott-Matthews was appointed an OBE in the New Years Honours list 2020 for services to British Theatre and the community in Hampstead.

References

Pub theatres in London
Theatres in the London Borough of Camden
Buildings and structures in Hampstead